ANK is an acronym for:
Air Nippon, ICAO airport code
Etimesgut Air Base, IATA airport code
Armée Nationale Khmère (Khmer National Army)
ANK '64, an Estonian artist collective

Ank as a word:
Karuka is known as ank in Angal language

 See also
 Ankh, an Egyptian hieroglyphic